"Don't Waste My Time" is a song by British musician Paul Hardcastle, released as the third and final single from his 1985 self-titled album. The song features lead vocals by Carol Kenyon. It was a top 20 hit in at least six countries, including the UK where it peaked at No. 8 in early 1986.

A 12" version, the 'Essential Well Hard Crucial Mix' features a cameo monologue by Lenny Henry's DJ character Delbert Wilkins.

Charts

Weekly charts

Year-end charts

References

1985 songs
1985 singles
1986 singles
Paul Hardcastle songs
Chrysalis Records singles
Song recordings produced by Paul Hardcastle